E-book software is software that allows the creation, editing, display, conversion and/or publishing of e-books. E-book software is available for many platforms in both paid, proprietary as well as free, open source form.

List of e-book software

See also
 Comparison of Android e-reader software

References

Desktop publishing software